is a Japanese light novel written by Miyako Aoyama, with illustrations by Chinese artist Zhao Yingle. The novel was originally serialized in Kodansha's Box-Air online magazine starting in 2013, and was later published in a single volume on September 2, 2014. An original video animation (OVA) was released on March 9, 2016, on DVD and Blu-ray. The anime is produced by Zexcs, with Hiromi Taniguchi directing and designing the characters, Yutaka Uemura assisting with the direction and Chika Suzumura writing the scripts.

References

2013 Japanese novels
Anime and manga based on light novels
Japanese serial novels
Kodansha books
Light novels
Light novels first published online
Zexcs